Philippe Stern (11 April 1895 – 4 April 1979) was a French art historian.

He worked at the Guimet Museum (1929-1965).

Literary works 
 Le Bàyon d'Angkor et l'évolution de l'art Khmer, 1927
 L'art du Champa et son évolution, 1942
 Colonnes indiennes d'Ajanta et d'Ellora, 1972

External links 
 http://angkor.wat.online.fr/dec-stern.htm 
 Trésors d'art du Vietnam, la sculpture du Champa
 Rénovation du musée national des Arts asiatiques-Guimet
 

French art historians
French orientalists
1895 births
1979 deaths
French Indologists
French male non-fiction writers
20th-century French male writers